The Armagh Community Hospital is a health facility at Tower Hill, Armagh, Northern Ireland. It is managed by the Southern Health and Social Care Trust. The Armagh Workhouse was once the largest such facility in Ulster.

History
The facility has its origins in the Armagh Union Workhouse which was designed by George Wilkinson and was completed in December 1841. After joining the National Health Service as Tower Hill Hospital in 1948, it evolved to become Armagh Community Hospital. The old workhouse infirmary, known as Riverside House, which became the headquarters of the headquarters of the local health and social services board in the 1990s, was marketed for sale in May 2016.

References

Southern Health and Social Care Trust
Hospitals established in 1841
1841 establishments in Ireland
Hospital buildings completed in 1841
Health and Social Care (Northern Ireland) hospitals
Hospitals in County Armagh
19th-century architecture in Northern Ireland